Santiago Giordana (born 3 May 1995) is an Argentine professional footballer who plays as a forward for Deportivo Garcilaso.

Career
Giordana's senior career started with Belgrano in 2015, three years after joining the club's youth system. He signed his first professional contract on 5 March, prior to being an unused substitute for an Argentine Primera División match with Olimpo on 31 August. Days later, versus Temperley, Giordana made his debut in a 2–1 defeat. In June 2016, Giordana joined Primera B Nacional side Guillermo Brown on loan for a year. He went onto score eight goals in forty matches, including his first vs. Los Andes on 21 September in a 2–0 victory.

On 28 August 2017, Giordana completed a loan move to Villa Dálmine of Primera B Nacional. His first appearance came three weeks later in a win over Boca Unidos. Twelve appearances later, Giordana returned to Belgrano and was subsequently signed by fellow Primera División team Temperley.

After spells at Alvarado (2019-20) and Chacarita Juniors (2020-21), Giordana joined Ecuadorian Serie A side Mushuc Runa in June 2021.

Career statistics
.

References

External links

1995 births
Living people
Sportspeople from Entre Ríos Province
Argentine footballers
Argentine expatriate footballers
Association football forwards
Argentine Primera División players
Primera Nacional players
Ecuadorian Serie A players
Club Atlético Belgrano footballers
Guillermo Brown footballers
Villa Dálmine footballers
Club Atlético Temperley footballers
Club Atlético Alvarado players
Chacarita Juniors footballers
Mushuc Runa S.C. footballers
Argentine expatriate sportspeople in Ecuador
Expatriate footballers in Ecuador
Argentine people of Italian descent
Deportivo Garcilaso players